Liu Zhenhua (July 1921 – 11 July 2018) was a general (shangjiang) of the Chinese People's Liberation Army and a diplomat of the People's Republic of China. He served as ambassador to Albania and Deputy Foreign Minister.

Biography 
He was born in Tai'an, Shandong in July 1921. He joined the Chinese Communist Party in 1938. He was a veteran of the Second Sino-Japanese War, Chinese Civil War and Korean War. He made significant contributions to the victories of the Battle of Jinzhou against Kuomintang forces of Liao Yaoxiang and the Pingjin Campaign against Kuomintang forces of Fu Zuoyi. He was an alternate member of the 9th Central Committee of the Chinese Communist Party and a delegate to the 8th National People's Congress. In 1964, he was promoted to major general. He was ambassador of China to Albania from 1971 to 1976. As ambassador, he made improvement to China–Greece relations by establishing diplomatic relations with Greece on June 6, 1972. In March 1979, he was made deputy political commissar of the Shenyang Military Region and political commissar of the Shenyang Military Region in October 1982. In 1987 he was transferred to the Beijing Military Region as its political commissar, holding that post until 1990. During his tenure in Beijing, he received his current rank of Shang Jiang in 1988.

References

1921 births
2018 deaths
Politicians from Tai'an
Ambassadors of China to Albania
People's Liberation Army generals from Shandong
Chinese people of World War II
People of the Chinese Civil War
Chinese military personnel of the Korean War
Alternate members of the 9th Central Committee of the Chinese Communist Party
Delegates to the 8th National People's Congress
Mayors of Lüda
Members of the Central Advisory Commission
Chinese Communist Party politicians from Shandong
People's Republic of China politicians from Shandong